The judiciary of Italy is a system of courts that interpret and apply the law in the Italian Republic. In Italy, judges are public officials and, since they exercise one of the sovereign powers of the State, only Italian citizens are eligible for judgeship. In order to become a judge, applicants must obtain a degree of higher education as well as pass written and oral examinations. However, most training and experience is gained through the judicial organization itself. The potential candidates then work their way up from the bottom through promotions.

Italy's independent judiciary enjoys special constitutional protection from the executive branch. Once appointed, judges serve for life and cannot be removed without specific disciplinary proceedings conducted in due process before the High Council of the Judiciary.

The structure of the Italian judiciary is divided into three tiers: inferior courts of original and general jurisdiction, intermediate appellate courts which hear cases on appeal from lower courts, and courts of last resort which hear appeals from lower appellate courts on the interpretation of law.

Law

The Italian legal system has a plurality of sources of production. These are arranged in a hierarchical scale, under which the rule of a lower source cannot conflict with the rule of an upper source (hierarchy of sources).

The Constitution of 1948 is the main source. The Italian civil code is based on codified Roman law with elements of the Napoleonic civil code and of the German BGB. The civil code of 1942 replaced the original one of 1865. The penal code ("The Rocco Code") was also written under fascism (1930).

Both the civil code and the penal code have been modified in order to be in conformity with the current democratic constitution.

The constitutional principles

The Constitution of the Italian Republic affirms some important general principles, such as art. 25 reiterating the importance of the natural judge and art. 102 where it is stated that the discipline of the judicial function is subject to the rules of the legal system as well as the prohibition of establishing new extraordinary judges or special judges.

Furthermore, according to the provisions of art. 104 of the Constitution, the judiciary constitutes an autonomous and independent order from any other power; therefore each magistrate, both judge and prosecutor, is also irremovable by law, unless he gives his consent or failing that only for the reasons and with the defense guarantees provided for by the Italian judicial system.

The self-governing body of the judiciary is the High Council of the Judiciary, an institution of constitutional importance, chaired by the President of the Italian Republic. This body is entitled, pursuant to art. 105 of the Constitution, in order to guarantee the autonomy and independence of the judiciary, recruitment, assignments and transfers, promotions and disciplinary measures towards judges.

The legal status

General provisions
The Italian judicial authority directly has the judicial police; ordinary magistrates are distinguished only by their functions and are irremovable, that is, they cannot be dispensed from service or transferred to another location without prior ruling by the High Council of the Judiciary. Magistrates in education offices as well as those of the public prosecutor are given the opportunity to carry weapons for self-defense without a license.

Components

Career magistrates — called togates — are divided into:
 ordinary: ordinary civil and criminal jurisdiction;
civilians
criminals
 administratives: Council of State, regional administrative courts, which have jurisdiction for the protection of legitimate interests in relation to the public administration and, in particular matters indicated by law (exclusive jurisdiction), also of subjective rights;
 accountants: Court of Audit, competence in the matter of compensation for tax damage, caused by those who manage and operate with public finances;
 fiscals: Provincial Commissions and, by appeal, in Regional Commissions, jurisdiction over disputes relating to any type of tax or tax.
Furthermore, art. 106 of the Italian Constitution establishes that the office of councilor of cassation can also be entrusted, for outstanding merits, to university professors in legal matters as well as to lawyers with at least 15 years of practice who are registered in the rolls for higher jurisdictions.

The Italian honorary judiciary, which supports the career judiciary, is composed of the honorary justice of peace, the honorary deputy prosecutor and the honorary court judge. The adjective "honorary" indicates that they carry out their duties in a non-professional manner, since they usually exercise jurisdiction for a fixed period of time without receiving remuneration, but only compensation for the activity carried out. Finally, there is the Italian military judiciary, a competence relating to military crimes committed by members belonging to the Italian armed forces.

Responsibility
The magistrates are liable in criminal, civil and disciplinary terms for the actions they have committed to the detriment of citizens in the exercise of their functions; the principle of public liability of judges has its basis in art. 28 of the Constitution, according to which the officials and employees of the State and public bodies are directly responsible, according to criminal, civil and administrative laws, for acts committed in violation of rights. In such cases it extends to the State and public bodies.

Personnel

Recruitment
In order to become magistrates, both ordinary toga and belonging to the Italian honorary magistracy, it is necessary to pass a public competition organized by the Ministry of Justice. For ordinary magistrates, in addition to obtaining a law degree, having obtained the title of lawyer and having a forensic service of at least five years and, if registered in the professional register of lawyers, not having incurred disciplinary sanctions. However, some alternative requirements are envisaged for obtaining the forensic qualification, namely:
 achievement of a diploma issued by the Specialization Schools for Legal Professions;
 achievement of a Doctor of Philosophy in law, or a specialization diploma from post-graduate specialization schools;
 be university lecturers in legal matters without incurring disciplinary sanctions;
 have been part of the Italian honorary magistracy for at least six years without demerit, without having been revoked and without having incurred disciplinary sanctions;
 be employees of the Italian administration with the qualification of belonging to a position of public belonging to C (according to the provisions of the sector to which the public belongs), belonging to the category of at least five years of seniority in the qualification, and not having incurred disciplinary sanctions;
 have undergone an internship at the judicial offices or have carried out a professional internship for 18 months at the State Attorney's Office;
 be administrative and accounting magistrates;
 be state prosecutors who have not incurred disciplinary sanctions.

In the case of professional magistrates, it is a competition for exams and the announcement is issued every two years, it consists of a written test, consisting in the preparation of three documents concerning civil law, criminal law and administrative law and a substantial oral one. in an interdisciplinary interview on the following subjects:
 Roman law;
 civil law;
 civil procedure;
 criminal law;
 administrative law;
 constitutional law;
 tax law;
 commercial law;
 bankruptcy law;
 labor law;
 social security law;
 European Union law;
 public international law and private international law;
 elements of legal information technology and the Italian judicial system;
 interview on a foreign language, indicated by the candidate when applying for participation in the competition, chosen from: English, Spanish, French or German.

The winners of the competition acquire the qualification of "ordinary internship magistrate", as required by the Mastella reform of 2007, which also made some changes in terms of access requirements, such as the elimination of the age limit. However, the declaration of non-eligibility for previously held competitions, if achieved three times on the expiry date of the deadline for submitting the application, will make it impossible to be admitted to further selections.

Training and updating

The following training activities are provided for ordinary magistrates:

 "initial training" (for internship magistrates);
 "permanent training" for professional judges (implemented nationally and locally)
 training for office managers;
 "permanent training" for honorary magistrates (implemented nationally and locally);
 "International training".

The "lifelong learning", previously carried out by the CSM (IX Commission), from autumn 2012 gradually passed to the Higher School of the Judiciary. The inauguration of the training activities at the single site of Villa Castel Pulci in Scandicci (Florence) took place on 15 October 2012.

Judicial stream

The Italian judiciary is the system of courts that adjudicates legal disputes/disagreements and interprets, defends, and applies the civil law, the criminal law and the administrative law in legal cases.

The structure of the Italian judiciary is divided into three tiers (gradi, sing. grado): primo grado ("first tier"), secondo grado ("second tier") and ultima istanza ("last resort") also called terzo grado ("third tier"). Inferior courts of original and general jurisdiction, intermediate appellate courts which hear cases on appeal from lower courts, and courts of last resort which hear appeals from lower appellate courts on the interpretation of law.

Giudice di pace

The giudice di pace ("justice of the peace") is the court of original jurisdiction for less significant civil matters. The court replaced the old preture ("Praetor Courts") and the giudice conciliatore ("judge of conciliation") in 1991.

Tribunale
The tribunale ("tribunal") is the court of general jurisdiction for civil matters. Here, litigants are statutorily required to be represented by an Italian barrister, or avvocato. It can be composed of one judge or of three judges, according to the importance of the case. When acting as Appellate Court for the Justice of the Peace, it is always monocratico (composed of only one Judge).

Divisions and Specialized Divisions
 Giudice del Lavoro ("labor tribunal"): hears disputes and suits between employers and employees (apart from cases dealt with in administrative courts, see below). A single judge presides over cases in the giudice del lavoro tribunal.
 Sezione specializzata agraria ("land estate court"): the specialized section that hears all agrarian controversies. Cases in this court are heard by two expert members in agricultural matters.
 Tribunale per i minorenni ("Family Proceedings Court"): the specialized section that hears all cases concerning minors, such as adoptions or emancipations; it is presided over by two professional judges and two lay judges.

Corte d'appello
The Corte d'appello ("Court of Appeal") has jurisdiction to retry the cases heard by the tribunale as a Court of first instance and is divided into three or more divisions: labor, civil, and criminal. Its jurisdiction is limited to a territorial constituency called a "district". The judgments of the court of appeal can be appealed with a Supreme Court of Cassation appeal.

Corte Suprema di Cassazione 

The Corte Suprema di Cassazione ("Supreme Court of Cassation") is the highest court of appeal or court of last resort in Italy. It has its seat in the Palace of Justice, Rome. The Court of Cassation also ensures the correct application of law in the inferior and appeal courts and resolves disputes as to which lower court (penal, civil, administrative, military) has jurisdiction to hear a given case.

Corte d'Assise

The Corte d'Assise ("Court of Assizes") has jurisdiction to try all crimes carrying a maximum penalty of 24 years in prison or more. These are the most serious crimes, such as terrorism and murder. Also slavery, killing a consenting human being, and helping a person to commit suicide are serious crimes that are tried by this court. Penalties imposed by the court can include life sentences (ergastolo).

Corte d'assise e d'appello
The Corte d'assise e d'appello ("Court of Assize Appeal") judges following an appeal against the sentences issued in the first instance by the assize court or by the judge of the preliminary hearing who has judged in the forms of the summary judgment on crimes whose knowledge is normally devolved to the court of assizes. An appeal is made to the Supreme Court of Cassation against its sentences. The Court of Assize Appeal is made up of two professional judges and eight lay judges.

Tribunale amministrativo regionale
The tribunale amministrativo regionale ("Regional administrative court") is competent to judge appeals, brought against administrative acts, by subjects who consider themselves harmed (in a way that does not comply with the legal system) in their own legitimate interest. These are administrative judges of first instance, whose sentences are appealable before the Council of State. For the same reason, it is the only type of special judiciary to provide for only two tiers of judgment.

Consiglio di Stato

The Consiglio di Stato ("Council of State") is, in the Italian legal system, a body of constitutional significance. Provided for by art. 100 of the Constitution, which places it among the auxiliary organs of the government, it is a judicial body, and is also the highest special administrative judge, in a position of third party with respect to the Italian public administration, pursuant to art. 103 of the Constitution.

Ministry of Justice

The Ministry of Justice handles the administration of courts and judiciary, including paying salaries and constructing new courthouses. The Ministry of Justice and that of the Infrastructure fund, and the Ministry of Justice and that of the Interior administer the prison system. 

Lastly, the Ministry of Justice receives and processes applications for presidential pardons and proposes legislation dealing with matters of civil or criminal justice.

Police forces

Penitentiary police

The polizia penitenziaria ("penitentiary police") is a law enforcement agency in Italy which is subordinate to the Ministry of Justice and operates the Italian prison system as corrections officers. The Vatican City, an independent state, does not have a prison system, so the Vatican sends convicted criminals to the Italian prison system. According to Interpol, this force (as part of the Ministry of Justice) has a "nationwide remit for prison security, inmate safety and transportation".

The polizia penitenziaria carries out the functions of the Judicial Police, Public Safety, Traffic Police and Corrections. They support other law enforcement agencies, such as with traffic roadblocks (known as a controllo). The polizia penitenziaria is one of the four national police forces of Italy (along with the Carabinieri, the Polizia di Stato and the Guardia di Finanza), with each force performing a slightly different function.

Judicial police
The polizia giudiziaria ("judicial police"), in Italy, indicates a civil service, exercised by subjects belonging to the Italian police forces and by certain officials of the Italian public administration; in the latter case in the cases expressly provided for by law. According to art. 109 of the Constitution of the Italian Republic, the Italian judicial authority directly disposes of the judicial police. They exist primarily to provide evidence to the prosecutor. They can arrest and interrogate suspects, conduct lineups, question witnesses, and even interrogate non-suspects.

See also

 Italian law codes
 Law of Italy
 Ministry of Justice (Italy)
 Polizia Penitenziaria

References 

 
Government of Italy
Italian constitutional institutions